Robert Noel (born 1962) is officer of arms at the College of Arms in London.

Robert Noel may also refer to:

 Robert Noel (businessman) (born 1964), chief executive of Land Securities Group plc
 Robert Edward Noel (born c. 1942), American attorney convicted with his wife for involuntary manslaughter, see Marjorie Knoller and Robert Noel

See also